APEC South Korea 2005 was a series of political meetings held around South Korea between the 21 member economies of the Asia-Pacific Economic Cooperation during 2005. Leaders from all the member countries met from 18 to 19 November 2005 in Busan.

Theme
The theme of the summit–Towards One Community: Meet the Challenge and Make the Change represents the strenuous will of APEC Member Economies to achieve the vision to build one "economic community" in the Asia-Pacific region.

Logo 
The APEC South Korea 2005 logo resembles South Korea's traditional Tri-Taegeuk mark which represents the unity and harmony of heaven, earth and man, the wave of Busan – the venue for the APEC 2005 Leaders' Meeting and the image of the Pacific Ocean encircled by APEC Member Economies.

References

2005 in South Korea
History of Busan
2005
Diplomatic conferences in South Korea
21st-century diplomatic conferences (Asia-Pacific)
2005 in international relations
2005 conferences
November 2005 events in South Korea